Ferocactus diguetii is a species of Ferocactus from Mexico.

References

External links
 
 

diguetii
Flora of Mexico
Plants described in 1922